Reality Arase Asemota (born 16 December 2002) is a Nigerian footballer who plays as a midfielder for Austrian club Grazer AK.

Career statistics

Club

Notes

References

2002 births
Living people
Nigerian footballers
Association football midfielders
Grazer AK players
2. Liga (Austria) players
Austrian Regionalliga players
Nigerian expatriate footballers
Expatriate footballers in Austria
Nigerian expatriate sportspeople in Austria